The Hasselbachplatz is a square in Magdeburg, which is located south of the city centre and is next to the Damaschkeplatz an important local traffic intersection. It is named after the longtime Magdeburg mayor Carl Gustav Friedrich Hasselbach. In recent years, the area around the square has become the center of Magdeburg's nightlife.

Gallery

References

External links
Hasselbachplatz at magdeburg.de 
Hasselbachplatz panorama view

Squares in Magdeburg
Buildings and structures in Magdeburg